Bistritsa or Bistrica (Бистрица, from Bulgarian бистър and ultimately Proto-Slavic *-bystr, meaning "clear, lucid, limpid") may refer to:

three villages in Bulgaria:
Bistritsa, Blagoevgrad Province
Bistritsa, Kyustendil Province
Bistritsa, Sofia
FC Vitosha Bistritsa, an association football club
Stadion Bistritsa, a football stadium
a high number of rivers:
Pirinska Bistritsa
Vitoshka Bistritsa, running through Pancharevo
Sandanska Bistritsa, running through Sandanski in Blagoevgrad Province
the South Slavic name of the Haliacmon, river in Greece
Tsarska Bistritsa, a former royal palace in Rila
several former villages in Bulgaria:
one formerly known as Tursko selo until 1878 and merged with Dolno selo, Kyustendil Province in 1959
one merged with Razliv, Sofia Province in 1965
an alternative name for the village of Bistrilitsa, Montana Province
 Bistritsa Grannies
 Bistritsa Monastery

See also
 Bistrica (disambiguation) for the Bosnian, Croatian, Serbian and Slovenian variant
 Bistritz (disambiguation) for the German variant
 Bistrița (disambiguation) for the Romanian variant
 Bystrica (disambiguation) for the Slovak variant
 Bystrzyca (disambiguation) for the Polish variant
 Feistritz (disambiguation) (Germanised word)